Maxime Barthelmé (born 8 September 1988) is a French professional footballer who plays as a midfielder for Ligue 2 club Guingamp.

Career
In August 2017 Barthelmé left FC Lorient after seven seasons with over 100 Ligue 1 appearances for the club to sign a two-year contract with LB Châteauroux, newly promoted to Ligue 2.

In June 2019, Barthelmé signed a three-year contract with Troyes AC.

On 5 July 2021, he joined Guingamp on a two-year contract.

References

External links
 
 

1988 births
Living people
Association football midfielders
French footballers
Racing Club de France Football players
FC Lorient players
Paris FC players
LB Châteauroux players
ES Troyes AC players
En Avant Guingamp players
Ligue 1 players
Ligue 2 players